Julien Simon (born 4 October 1985 in Rennes) is a French road bicycle racer, who currently rides for UCI ProTeam .

Simon joined the  squad for the 2014 season, after his previous team –  – folded at the end of the 2013 season. He was named in the start list for the 2015 Vuelta a España.

Major results

2007
 8th Overall Tour du Haut-Anjou
2008
 9th Tour du Doubs
2009
 2nd Overall Tour du Gévaudan Languedoc-Roussillon
 5th Overall Circuit de la Sarthe
 7th Overall Tour du Haut Var
 7th Paris–Camembert
 10th Tour du Finistère
2010
 3rd Overall Circuit de la Sarthe
 4th Overall Tour de Wallonie
 4th Grand Prix de Wallonie
 5th Overall Boucles de la Mayenne
 5th Les Boucles du Sud Ardèche
 5th Route Adélie
2011
 1st Prueba Villafranca de Ordizia
 2nd Grand Prix de Wallonie
 3rd Overall Circuit de Lorraine
 5th Grand Prix de Plumelec-Morbihan
 5th Duo Normand (with Paul Poux)
 5th Paris–Bourges
 7th Polynormande
 9th GP Ouest–France
2012
 1st Tour du Finistère
 1st Grand Prix de Plumelec-Morbihan
 1st Grand Prix de Wallonie
 Volta a Catalunya
1st Stages 5 & 7
 3rd Overall Tour du Haut Var
 3rd Route Adélie
 5th Boucles de l'Aulne
 6th Tour du Doubs
2013
 3rd Grand Prix de Plumelec-Morbihan
 6th Route Adélie
 8th Les Boucles du Sud Ardèche
 8th Tour de Vendée
 9th Overall Tour du Haut Var
 9th Grand Prix de Fourmies
 9th Tour du Doubs
 9th Grand Prix de Wallonie
 10th Grand Prix d'Isbergues
2014
 1st Overall French Road Cycling Cup
 1st Grand Prix de Plumelec-Morbihan
 2nd Route Adélie
 2nd Tour du Finistère
 3rd Overall Circuit de la Sarthe
 6th Grand Prix d'Ouverture La Marseillaise
 6th Paris–Camembert
 6th Grand Prix d'Isbergues
 7th Overall Critérium International
 7th Grand Prix de Wallonie
 9th Tour de Vendée
 10th Brussels Cycling Classic
 10th Tour du Doubs
2015
 2nd Grand Prix de Plumelec-Morbihan
 3rd Tour du Finistère
2016
 2nd Classic Sud-Ardèche
 4th Overall Tour du Haut Var
 4th La Drôme Classic
 4th Tour du Finistère
2017
 2nd Overall Tour du Haut Var
1st Stage 2
 2nd Tour du Finistère
 3rd Route Adélie
 3rd Grand Prix de Wallonie
 4th Overall Circuit de la Sarthe
 4th Overall Tour du Limousin
 5th Grand Prix de Plumelec-Morbihan
 7th Classic Sud-Ardèche
 8th Gran Premio Bruno Beghelli
2018
 1st Tour du Doubs
 2nd Grand Prix de Plumelec-Morbihan
 5th Clásica de San Sebastián
 7th Coppa Sabatini
 8th Tre Valli Varesine
2019
 1st Tour du Finistère
 2nd Road race, National Road Championships
 8th Overall Tour de l'Ain
 8th Tour du Doubs
 8th Tour de Vendée
 10th Overall Boucles de la Mayenne
 10th Route Adélie
2020
 7th La Drôme Classic
2021
 4th La Drôme Classic
 6th Tour du Finistère
 7th Tour du Doubs
 9th Prueba Villafranca de Ordizia
 10th Grand Prix of Aargau Canton
2022
 1st Overall French Road Cycling Cup
 1st Grand Prix du Morbihan
 1st Tour du Finistère
 1st Stage 1 Tour du Limousin
 4th Overall Boucles de la Mayenne
 4th Tour du Jura
 5th Grand Prix d'Isbergues
 7th Circuit Franco–Belge
 7th Grand Prix de Fourmies
 8th Overall Four Days of Dunkirk
 8th Boucles de l'Aulne
 8th Polynormande
 9th Tour de Vendée

Grand Tour results timeline

References

External links

 
 
 
 
 

1985 births
Living people
French male cyclists
Cyclists from Rennes